The 4th Air Support Operations Group (4 ASOG) is an active unit of the United States Air Force, assigned to the 435th Air Ground Operations Wing. It is stationed at the Lucius D. Clay Kaserne in Wiesbaden, Germany. The group's members mainly support United States Army Europe and Africa units by providing Tactical Air Control Party (TACP) airmen to army units, as well as providing weather support in Europe and Africa. Airmen from the 4th ASOG also serve as trainers at the Joint Multinational Readiness Center in Hohenfels, Germany.

Assigned units
 2nd Air Support Operations Squadron (2 ASOS) (Vilseck, Germany)
 7th Combat Weather Squadron (7 CWS)

Lineage
 Constituted as the 4th Communications Squadron, Air Support on 15 May 1942
 Activated on 5 June 1942
 Redesignated 4th Air Support Communication Squadron on 11 January 1943
 Redesignated 4th Air Support Control Squadron on 20 August 1943
 Redesignated 4th Tactical Air Communications Squadron on 1 April 1944
 Inactivated on 5 June 1947
 Disbanded on 8 October 1948
  Reconstituted and consolidated with the 601st Air Support Operations Group on 8 February 1988
 Redesignated 601st Air Support Operations Center Group on 8 March 1984
 Activated on 15 March 1984
 Redesignated 601st Air Support Operations Group on 1 May 1985
 Redesignated 4th Air Support Operations Group on 1 March 1988
 Inactivated on 1 July 1994
 Activated on 1 August 1996

Assignments
 IV Ground Air (later, IV Air) Support Command, 5 June 1942
 Desert Training Center, 21 January 1943
 Fourth Air Force, 7 September 1943
 Ninth Air Force, 16 November 1943
 IX Fighter Command, 19 November 1943
 IX Air Support Command, 12 December 1943
 XIX Air Support (later, XIX Tactical Air) Command, 4 March 1944
 XII Tactical Air Command, 4 July 1945 – 5 June 1947
 601st Tactical Control Wing, 15 March 1984
 65th Air Division, 1 June 1985 (attached to Seventeenth Air Force for operational control, 31 October 1985 – 14 March 1986)
 Seventeenth Air Force, 15 March 1986 – 1 July 1994
 Third Air Force, 1 August 1996
 Sixteenth Air Force, 1 November 2005
 Third Air Force, 1 December 2006
 435th Air Ground Operations Wing, 16 July 2009 – present

Stations

 Hamilton Field, California, 5 June 1942
 Camp Young, California, 4 November 1942
 Thermal AAB, California, 12 February 1943
 Camp Kilmer, New Jersey, 29 October 1943 – 5 November 1943
 Scotland, 16 November 1943
 Aldermaston Court, England, 3 December 1943
 Criqueville, France, 10 July 1944
 Nehou, France, circa 13 July 1944
 St Germain, France, 17 August 1944
 Autainville, France, 31 August 1944
 Chalons-sur-Marne, France, circa 14 September 1944
 Étain, France, 23 September 1944
 Nancy, France, 5 October 1944
 Rollingergrund, Luxembourg, 7 January 1945
 Idar Oberstein, Germany, 27 March 1945
 Frankfurt-on-Main, Germany, 3 April 1945
 Hersfeld, Germany, 11 April 1945
 Erlangen, Germany, 23 April 1945
 Bad Kissingen, Germany 1 November 1945
 Bad Neustadt, Germany, 29 August 1946 – 5 June 1947
 Frankfurt, Germany, 15 March 1984 – 1 July 1994
 Heidelberg, Germany, 1 August 1996
 Wiesbaden, Germany 31 March 2013 – present

References 

Groups of the United States Air Force